Bas Dost (born 31 May 1989) is a Dutch professional footballer who plays as a forward for Eredivisie club FC Utrecht.

Having begun his career at FC Emmen in the Eerste Divisie, Dost later played in the Eredivisie for Heracles Almelo and SC Heerenveen. In 2012, after being the top scorer in the league with 32 goals in 34 games, he was signed by VfL Wolfsburg. Four years later, having helped his team win the DFB-Pokal he signed for Primeira Liga side Sporting CP. He won the Bola de Prata for top scorer in his first Primeira Liga season, with 34 goals in 31 games. At Sporting, Dost won the Taça de Portugal once and the Taça da Liga twice, totalling 93 goals in 125 games.

Dost played for the Netherlands at under-20 and under-21 level. He was called up to the senior side for the first time in August 2012, but did not make his debut until March 2015. He earned 18 caps and scored once for the Dutch national team before retiring from them in 2018.

Club career

Early career
Born in Deventer, Dost's first club was CVV Germanicus in Coevorden, where he spent his youth career. After a few seasons, FC Emmen took Dost into their youth academy. He scored a hat-trick in the derby match against BV Veendam, which Emmen won 3–2.

Dost moved to Heracles Almelo in the summer of 2008. With 14 goals, he was the top scoring native player in the 2009–10 Eredivisie.

SC Heerenveen
On 18 May 2010, 20-year-old Dost was signed by SC Heerenveen for a transfer fee of around €3.2 million, on a five-year-deal. In his first season, he was the club's top scorer with 13 league goals.

On 10 December 2011, Dost scored all five goals in Heerenveen's 5–0 win away to SBV Excelsior, taking his total to 14 goals in 16 Eredivisie games. He finished as the topscorer in the Eredivisie with 32 league goals in 34 matches.

VfL Wolfsburg
Dost joined German club VfL Wolfsburg in June 2012. He made his Bundesliga debut on 25 August 2012, scoring the winner away against VfB Stuttgart. Dost started the 2014–15 season as Wolfsburg's third choice striker and made his European debut in a 4–2 win against FC Krasnodar in the Europa League. In February 2014 Dost scored four goals, away from home against Bayer Leverkusen in a 5–4 win, his first hat-trick for the club in a run of scoring nine goals in 10 Bundesliga matches. Five days later he scored his first goals in a UEFA competition, scoring both in a 2–0 win against Sporting CP in the first knockout round of the Europa League.

Wolfsburg reached the final of the 2015 DFB-Pokal final. Dost headed in the final goal from an Ivan Perišić cross as Wolfsburg won 3–1 over Borussia Dortmund at the Olympiastadion.

Sporting CP
In August 2016, Portuguese club Sporting CP signed Dost for a club record €10 million, potentially rising to €12 million, and a buyout clause of €60 million. He made his debut on 10 September at home to Moreirense F.C., concluding a 3–0 win; thirteen days later he scored for the third successive game, netting twice in a 4–2 victory over G.D. Estoril Praia again at the Estádio José Alvalade.

Dost scored all of Sporting's goals on 11 March 2017 as they won 4–1 at C.D. Tondela; two were penalties, of which he later missed another. The league named him Player of the Month for March, with six goals in three games. On 9 April, he scored another hat-trick in a 4–0 home win over Boavista FC, and three weeks later another treble won the game 3–2 at S.C. Braga.  He ended the season on 21 May with his fourth hat-trick of the campaign in a 4–1 home win over G.D. Chaves. With 34 league goals in 31 games, he was awarded the Bola de Prata as top scorer.

Dost scored another hat-trick against Chaves on 22 October 2017, in a 5–1 home win. On 1 December, he scored the only goal of a win over Lisbon neighbours C.F. Os Belenenses, taking him to 50 goals in 62 games across all competitions for the Lions. He scored another hat-trick on 7 January 2018 in a 5–0 home win over C.S. Marítimo and added another in a 3–0 win over C.D. Aves a week later. On 27 January, he scored two penalties – one to equalise in a 1–1 draw and the other in the penalty shootout – as Sporting won the 2018 Taça da Liga Final against Vitória F.C. at the Estádio Municipal de Braga.

In April 2018, Dost ended a run of 45 first time finishes when he took a touch before scoring in a Sporting win against Belenenses. Later, on 15 May, he and several of his teammates, including coaches, were injured following an attack by around 50 supporters of Sporting at the club's training ground after the team finished third in the league and missed out on the UEFA Champions League qualification. Despite the attack, he and the rest of the team agreed to play in the Portuguese Cup final scheduled for the following weekend, losing 2–1 to Aves. Days later, he terminated his contract with Sporting. However, after the dismissal of Bruno de Carvalho as club president, Dost signed an improved contract.

Dost was voted the Player of the Month and Striker of the Month for October/November 2018, with three goals in three games. In the 2019 Taça da Liga Final against FC Porto on 26 January, he scored a last-minute penalty to seal a 1–1 draw and send the game to extra time; he scored again in the penalty shootout as his club retained the title. On 25 May in the 2019 Taça de Portugal Final against the same opponents, he scored an extra-time goal and missed in the penalty shootout, but his team still won.

Eintracht Frankfurt
On 26 August 2019, Dost returned to the Bundesliga, signing a three-year contract at Eintracht Frankfurt. He arrived to replace departed strikers Luka Jović and Sébastien Haller, on a fee reported as €7 million. He scored on his debut six days later, a 2–1 victory over Fortuna Düsseldorf, having come on at half time for Dejan Joveljić.

Dost arrived at a club which had lost Jović, Haller and Ante Rebić in high-profile transfers, but combined well with Portuguese attacking duo André Silva and Gonçalo Paciência during his one full season.

Club Brugge 
On 24 December 2020, Dost agreed to join Belgian First Division A club Club Brugge. He made his debut on 10 January away to Sint-Truidense V.V., scoring the opening goal of a 2–1 win. He ended his first half-season as league champion. His team retained the title in 2021–22, after which his contract expired.

Utrecht
On 1 July 2022, FC Utrecht announced the signing of Dost on a one-year contract, as he returned to the Eredivisie after a decade abroad. He made his debut on 6 August, scoring twice to gain an opening 2–2 draw at RKC Waalwijk.

International career

In August 2012, he was called up by new manager Louis van Gaal for a friendly match in the King Baudouin Stadium in Brussels against Belgium but did not feature. He returned to the squad in March 2015 after a spell of good form for Wolfsburg, being named in Guus Hiddink's squad for a European qualifier against Turkey, and a friendly against Spain. He made his debut in the first match on 28 March at the Amsterdam ArenA, replacing defensive midfielder Nigel de Jong after 63 minutes as the Netherlands equalised for a 1–1 draw. On 13 November, away to Wales at the Cardiff City Stadium, he headed his first international goal to open a 3–2 win.

In April 2018 Dost announced his retirement from international football at the age of 28, saying that he had considered it for some time due to a lack of success with the national team.

Personal life
Dost is in a relationship with Annefleur de Leeuw, a Dutch cyclist who competes for Sporting. Their son was born in July 2018.

Career statistics

Club

International

Score and result list Netherlands' goal tally first.

Honours
VfL Wolfsburg
 DFB-Pokal: 2014–15
 DFL-Supercup: 2015

Sporting CP
 Taça de Portugal: 2018–19
 Taça da Liga: 2017–18, 2018–19

Club Brugge
 Belgian Pro League: 2020–21, 2021–22
 Belgian Super Cup: 2021

Individual
 Eredivisie Top Scorer: 2011–12
 KNVB Cup Top Scorer: 2011–12
kicker Bundesliga Team of the Season: 2014–15
O Jogo Primeira Liga Team of the Year: 2017
 Primeira Liga Top Scorer: 2016–17
 Primeira Liga Player of the Month: March 2017, October/November 2018

References

External links

 Bas Dost at Topforward

1989 births
Living people
Footballers from Deventer
Dutch footballers
Association football forwards
FC Emmen players
Heracles Almelo players
SC Heerenveen players
VfL Wolfsburg players
Sporting CP footballers
Eintracht Frankfurt players
Club Brugge KV players
FC Utrecht players
Eerste Divisie players
Eredivisie players
Bundesliga players
Primeira Liga players
Belgian Pro League players
Netherlands youth international footballers
Netherlands under-21 international footballers
Netherlands international footballers
Dutch expatriate footballers
Dutch expatriate sportspeople in Germany
Dutch expatriate sportspeople in Portugal
Dutch expatriate sportspeople in Belgium
Expatriate footballers in Germany
Expatriate footballers in Portugal
Expatriate footballers in Belgium